Matt Hicks (born 1961) is a sports broadcaster who calls Texas Rangers games alongside Eric Nadel on the radio.

Broadcasting career
In the middle of the 2012 season, Hicks joined the Rangers after spending 10 years with the Corpus Christi Hooks. He replaced Steve Busby, who replaced Dave Barnett as the primary television play-by-play announcer for the Rangers due to Barnett's health issues. Before the 2013 season, Hicks' promotion was made permanent. Before his tenure with the Hooks, he was also the voice of the El Paso Diablos and the Frederick Keys. He also called the Houston Astros minor league game of the week on Fox Sports Southwest. Outside of baseball, Hicks called high school football for the Texas Sports Radio Network, professional ice hockey for the El Paso Buzzards, and worked at the collegiate level with the Texas A&M Aggies, Mount St. Mary's Mountaineers, James Madison Dukes, UTEP Miners, New Mexico State Aggies, and Maryland Terrapins, primarily in football, basketball, baseball, and lacrosse.

Personal
Hicks graduated from the University of Maryland in 1983. Outside of his broadcasting duties, he serves as a chess instructor, basketball referee, and swimming meet timer.

References

Living people
People from Corpus Christi, Texas
University of Maryland, College Park alumni
People from El Paso, Texas
Texas Rangers (baseball) announcers
Major League Baseball broadcasters
Maryland Terrapins baseball announcers
Maryland Terrapins men's basketball announcers
Maryland Terrapins football announcers
College football announcers
High school football announcers in the United States
College basketball announcers in the United States
Minor League Baseball broadcasters
College baseball announcers in the United States
Lacrosse announcers
1961 births
People from Washington, D.C.